River Plate is taking part of the 2015–16 season in the Uruguayan Primera División. They also took part in the 2016 Copa Libertadores, reaching the group stage.

Transfer Window

Winter 2015

In

Out

Summer 2016

In

Out

Squad

First Team

Out on loan

Top Scorers 
Last update on May 31, 2016

Disciplinary Record 
Last updated on May 31, 2016

Primera División

Apertura 2015

League table

Results by round

Matches

Clausura 2016

League table

Result by round

Matches

Overall table 2015–2016

Copa Libertadores

Pre-eliminary round

Round 1

Group table

Matches

References

River Plate Montevideo seasons
River Plate